Al-Juwayni, `Abd Allah ibn Yusuf ibn `Abd Allah ibn Yusuf ibn Muhammad ibn Hayyuya, Rukn al-Din Abu Muhammad al-Ta'i al-Sinbisi al-Naysaburi al-Shafi`i al-Ash`ari, also known as Abu Muhammad al-Juwayni (d. 438), was a Sunni scholar, foremost leading jurist and scholar of legal theory, theology, man of letters, grammar, hadith and father of the great Imam al-Haramayn al-Juwayni.

Biography

Birth and education
He was born in the villages of Juwayn in modern-day northeastern Iran, grew up in there, and read literature under his father Yusuf bin Abdullah, Abi Yaqoub. He studied Shafi'i jurisprudence in Naysabur with Abu al-Tayyib al-Su`luki and in Merv with Abu Bakr al-Qaffal al-Marwazi. He also studied hadith from Abu Nu'aym al-Isfahani, Ibn Mahmish, Abu al-Husayn ibn Bishran, and others.

Career
He settled in Nishapur after his intense educational journeys and began to issue fatwas, teach, and debate in the year 407 of Hijri. He became popular for his assiduous worship and the great dignity, majesty, and earnestness of his scholarly gatherings.

Students
His famous students who became giants of their time include:
 Al-Juwayni (his son & foremost student) 
 Abu Uthman al-Sabuni
 Ali ibn Ahmed ibn Al-Akhram 
 Sahel bin Ibrahim Al-Masjidi

Abu Muhammad al-Juwayni related that he once saw Prophet Yusuf in his dream where upon he fell to his knees in order to kiss his feet, but Yusuf prevented him as a mark of honour for the Imam, so the latter kissed Yusuf's heels. Abu Muhammad al-Juwayni said: "I interpreted it to mean that there would be blessing and honour in what I would leave behind." Ibn al-Subki commented: "What greater blessing and honour than his son (Al-Juwayni)!"

Death
He died in the year 1046.

Abu Salih al-Mu'adhdhin said: "I gave Abu Muhammad his funeral bath. When we were wrapping him in the shroud I saw his right arm to the arm-pit luminous like the moon. I was bewildered, then I said to myself: these are the blessings of his legal responses."

Reception
Al-Sabuni said: "If Shaykh Abu Muhammad had been born among the Israelites, they would have transmitted his immense merits to us and he would have made their pride."

Ibn Asakir narrates from his maternal uncle, `Abd al-Wahid ibn `Abd al-Karim al-Qushayri the son of Imam Abu al-Qasim: "In his time our [Ash`ari and Shafi`i] imams and the verifying scholars among our companions saw in him such perfection and high merit that they used to say: If it were permissible to hold that Allah sent another prophet in our time, it would not have been other than he."

Works
 Al-Furuq
 Al-Jam` wa al-Farq
 Mawqif al-Imam wa al-Ma'mum
 Al-Muhit, in which the imam intended to compile a fiqh manual in disregard of the Shafi`i school and based only on hadith proof-texts. Al-Bayhaqi criticized the weakness of the hadiths he saw him adduce and pointed out to him that Al-Shafi`i was meticulous enough in inferring his jurisprudence from hadith proof-texts. The imam accepted Al-Bayhaqi's advice and abandoned its completion
 Al-Mu`tasar fi Mukhtasar al-Mukhtasar, and abridgment of Al-Muzani's abridgment in Shafi`i fiqh
 Al-Silsila in fiqh
 Al-Tabsira fi al-Waswasa on acts of worship* al-Tadhkira
 Al-Tafsir al-Kabir, reported by Abd al-Ghafir al-Farsi in his history of Naysabur to contain, for each verse, a different explanation according to ten different disciplines or perspectives.
 Al-Ta`liqa

See also
 List of Ash'aris and Maturidis

Citations

References

 
 
 
 
 
 
 

1046 deaths
Asharis
Shafi'is
11th-century Muslim theologians
Sunni fiqh scholars
Persian Sunni Muslim scholars of Islam
Muhaddiths from Nishapur
Quranic exegesis scholars
11th-century jurists
Medieval grammarians of Arabic
11th-century Muslim scholars of Islam
Sunni Muslim scholars of Islam
Juvayni family